Cornelia Nixon (born March 25, 1947) is an American novelist, short-story writer, and teacher. She has lived much of her mature life in the San Francisco Bay area.

Early years and education
Cornelia Nixon was born in Boston, Massachusetts, March 25, 1947.
She attended the University of California, Irvine, where she earned a BA in English with a creative writing emphasis, having been influenced by the fiction of Albert Camus in high school and that of D. H. Lawrence in college. She received an MFA from San Francisco State University and a PhD from the University of California, Berkeley.

Career
Nixon taught at Indiana University, Bloomington, Indiana, from 1981 to 2000, and then joined the faculty at Mills College, Oakland, California. She retired from teaching in 2016.

Nixon wrote two unpublished novels before becoming assistant professor at Indiana University. Her first published book was Lawrence's Leadership Politics and the Turn Against Women, a critical essay that examined what Nixon saw as the change in gender power dynamics between D. H. Lawrence's The Rainbow and Women in Love, a supposed sequel The Rainbow.

In 1991, Nixon wrote Now You See It, a novel in stories. It was very favorably reviewed by Michiko Kakutani in the New York Times, by Richard Locke in The Wall Street Journal, in The Chicago Tribune, and Entertainment Weekly. In 2000, Nixon's published Angels Go Naked, a collection of interrelated short stories that form a larger narrative. It was reviewed in The New York Times Book Review.

Nixon's novel Jarrettsville was released October 1, 2009, and was reviewed (unfavorably) in The New York Times, as well as (favorably) in The Washington Post, Kirkus Reviews, Publishers Weekly, and San Francisco Magazine. It won the Michael Shaara Prize for Excellence in Civil War Fiction, awarded by the Civil War Institute at Gettysburg College. In 2017 sociologist Clayton Childress published Under the Cover: The Creation, Production, and Reception of a Novel (Princeton: Princeton University Press, 2016), which used Jarrettsville as its focus in tracing a novel from inspiration through publication and then reception by reviewers and readers.

Nixon's fourth novel and fifth book, "The Use of Fame," was published by Counterpoint Press in May 2017.  Nixon has also contributed to periodicals such as the New England Review, the Iowa Review and Ploughshares.

Personal life
She was married to poet Dean Young from 1983 to 2010. In 2015, she married her former teacher and mentor at UC-Irvine, Hazard Adams.

Awards
 The 2010 Michael Shaara Prize for Excellence in Civil War Fiction, awarded to her novel Jarrettsville''
 First Prize O. Henry Award 1995
 O. Henry Award 1993
 Nelson Algren Award, Chicago Tribune (1988)
 Carl Sandburg Award in Fiction (1991)
 National Endowment for the Arts (1992)
 Pushcart Prizes in 1995 and 2003
 Carnegie Fellowship to the Mary Ingraham Bunting Institute at Radcliffe 1986-87

Works
The Use of Fame, Counterpoint 2017

Angels Go Naked*: A Novel, publisher Counterpoint, Paperback released November 2010

Anthologies

Prize Stories 1995: The O. Henry Awards, First Prize Winner. Ed. William Abrahams, Doubleday, 1995.
Pushcart Prize XX: Best of the Small Presses (1995). Ed. Bill Henderson. Pushcart Press.

Modern American Bestsellers, Moscow (in Russian), 2002.
The Believer Book of Writers Talking to Writers. Ed. Vendela Vida. McSweeney's Press, 2007.

References

External links
 Cornelia Nixon at the Biography Resource Center
 Contributions by Cornelia Nixon at Ploughshares
 Cornelia Nixon at the Gale Virtual Reference Library

Living people
Indiana University faculty
University of California, Irvine alumni
University of California, Berkeley alumni
San Francisco State University alumni
20th-century American novelists
21st-century American novelists
American women novelists
O. Henry Award winners
20th-century American women writers
21st-century American women writers
Novelists from Indiana
1947 births
American women academics